Sante Notarnicola (15 December 1938 – 22 March 2021) was an Italian communist militant, robber, murderer and poet.

He died due to complications from influenza, in Bologna, after recovering from COVID-19.

In popular culture 
Notarnicola was portrayed by Don Backy in the 1968 crime film Bandits in Milan, directed by Carlo Lizzani.

References

Bibliography

Italian male poets
1938 births
2021 deaths
Italian communists
20th-century Italian poets